Peter J. Darby (1938 – 18 December 2022) was an Irish Gaelic footballer and hurler who played at club level with Trim and at inter-county level with the Meath senior teams. He usually lined out as a defender.

Playing career

Darby enjoyed a hugely successful club career as a dual player with Trim. In 1962 he captained the team from full-back to their only Keegan Cup triumph, while he also won five Meath SHC titles. After a period with the Meath minor team, Darby made his senior team debut as a 19-year-old against Dublin in 1958. He was one of the key figures on the team that made a breakthrough and won the Leinster Championship in 1964. Darby was at left corner-back for the All-Ireland final defeat by Galway. He was named captain of the team the following year and was again at left corner-back when Meath beat Cork in the 1967 All-Ireland final.

Post playing career

In retirement from playing Darby served as chairman of the Trim club, was a Meath senior selector and an officer of the Meath County Board. He was inducted into the Meath GAA Hall of Fame in December 2017.

Darby died on 18 December 2022, at the age of 84.

Honours

Trim
Meath Senior Football Championship: 1962 (c)
Meath Senior Hurling Championship: 1955, 1956, 1957, 1959, 1960

Meath
All-Ireland Senior Football Championship: 1967
Leinster Senior Football Championship: 1964, 1966, 1967
Leinster Junior Hurling Championship: 1961

References

1938 births
2022 deaths
Dual players
Trim Gaelic footballers
Trim hurlers
Meath inter-county Gaelic footballers
Meath inter-county hurlers
Leinster inter-provincial Gaelic footballers
Gaelic football selectors